Dharkan is a 1972 Indian film directed by Devendra Goel. The movie stars Sanjay Khan, Mumtaz, Rajendra Nath, Helen, Alankar Joshi, Roopesh Kumar and Bindu (in a cameo role). It was produced and directed by Devendra Goyal, and the music was given by Ravi.

Plot
It is the story of the rebirth of millionaire child Deepak Rai, who accidentally shoots his friend, Suraj Prakash (Sanjay Khan) at the age of 10 and believing him to be dead, runs away from home. 14 years later, Deepak discovers that Suraj Prakash is not dead and decides to go back home with friend Kewal Sharma (Roopesh Kumar). On discovering that Deepak is a millionnaire, Kewal Sharma kills Deepak on the train journey to Deepak's home city (Anandgiri) and starts living Deepak's life. Meanwhile, the real Deepak Rai (killed) is reborn as Rekha's (Mumtaz's) brother. 5 years later, Kewal Sharma marries Rekha, who is Suraj Prakash's girlfriend. On discovering that Rekha's husband is a drunkard and a womaniser, Rekha's father dies of a heart attack and Rekha's brother (Doby, rebirth of actual Deepak Rai) comes to stay in Deepak Rai's house. Doby, aged 5 by now, knows all about the house and the estate, although he has never been there before in his present life. Suraj Prakash and friend, Inspector Darshan (Rajendra Nath) figure out the mystery behind Doby's familiarity of the place and decide to collect enough evidence against Kewal Sharma to prove him guilty of his crime of murder and deceit.

Characters
 Sanjay Khan ... Suraj Prakash
 Mumtaz ... Rekha D. Prasad
 Rajendra Nath ... Inspector Darshan K. Lal
 Helen ... Laajwanti
 Bindu ... Prostitute
 Roopesh Kumar ... Kewal Sharma

Soundtrack

External links
 

1972 films
1970s Hindi-language films
Films scored by Ravi
Films directed by Devendra Goel